Georges Borgeaud (27 July 1914, in Lausanne – 6 December 1998, in Paris) was a Swiss writer and publisher.

Education
Georges Borgeaud studied at Collège d'Aubonne and Collège de Saint-Maurice, where he met Maurice Chappaz and Jean Cuttat.
His novel The Préau (1952), partly autobiographical, also described this period of his life.
He gave private lessons, and worked as a bookseller in Zurich and Fribourg.
His stay at Glérolles Castle, where he met S. Corinna Bille, provides the framework for his second novel The Dishes of Bishops (1959). A collection of poetic prose, Italy (1959), followed, and a monograph on the painter Pierre Boncompain.

Georges Borgeaud settled in Paris in 1946. He wrote slowly and carefully rewrote several times his manuscripts, and excelling in describing the world outside. His estate is archived in the Swiss Literary Archives in Bern.

Awards
He won awards: Critics Award for The Awning (1952), the International Journalism Award in Rome (1962), the Prix Renaudot for travel abroad (1974), the Prix Médicis for essay (1986).
Georges Borgeaud also received a special tribute in 1989 of Vaud Foundation for the promotion and artistic creation.

Works
; Éditions L'Age d'homme, 1982
La Vaisselle des évêques, roman, Gallimard, 1959
Italiques, chroniques, Éditions L'Age d'homme, 1969
Le Voyage à l'étranger, roman, Bertil Galland, 1974, 
Le Soleil sur Aubiac, Bernard Grasset, 1987, Prix Jacques-Chardonne (1987)
Mille Feuilles (tomes I-IV), chroniques, 1997-1999; La Bibliothèque des arts, 1997, 
Le Jour du printemps, roman, Denoël, 1999,

References

External links
Official website
Literary estate of Georges Borgeaud in the archive database HelveticArchives of the Swiss National Library
Publications by Georges Borgeaud and about Georges Borgeaud in the catalogue Helveticat of the Swiss National Library
Documentary film on Georges Borgeaud

1914 births
1998 deaths
People from Lausanne
Prix Renaudot winners
Prix Médicis essai winners